Cheshmeh-ye Zamzam is a village in Teshkan Rural District, Chegeni District, Dowreh County, Lorestan Province, Iran. At the 2006 census, its population was 503, in 107 families.

References 

Towns and villages in Dowreh County